= Komfort Koach 200 =

There have been two NASCAR Busch Series (now Xfinity Series) races named the Komfort Koach 200:

- Komfort Koach 200 (spring), run at North Carolina Motor Speedway in March in 1984 and 1985
- Komfort Koach 200 (fall), run at North Carolina Motor Speedway in October in 1984
